Anne Cecilie Dornonville de la Cour (born 8 December 1993) is a Danish handball player for Odense Håndbold and the Danish national team.

Individual awards
Danish League Best Right Back: 2015

References

1993 births
Living people
Danish female handball players
Sportspeople from Aarhus
Viborg HK players